The 1991 Toronto municipal election was held on November 12, 1991 to elect councillors in Metropolitan Toronto, Ontario, Canada, and mayors, councillors and school trustees in Toronto, York, East York, North York, Scarborough and Etobicoke.

Under the 1989 Municipal Act changes, the title of alderman was changed to councillor across Metro.

Leadership
Metro Toronto Chairman - Alan Tonks
Mayor of Toronto - June Rowlands
Mayor of East York - David Johnson (1992–93), Michael Prue (1993-94)
Mayor of Etobicoke - Bruce Sinclair 
Mayor of North York - Mel Lastman 
Mayor of Scarborough - Joyce Trimmer
Mayor of York - Fergy Brown

Metro

Metro council was mostly unchanged from that elected in the 1988 election. The only incumbent defeated was Bob Sanders in Scarborough Malvern, who was ousted by Raymond Cho. New arrivals included school board trustee Olivia Chow elected downtown.
 High Park
Derwyn Shea (incumbent) - 13,706
David Miller - 8,079
Yaqoob Khan - 1,544

Trinity Niagara
Joe Pantalone (incumbent) - 9,084
Michael Baillargeon - 3,610
Charlene Cottle - 1,364

Downtown
Olivia Chow - 10,024
Storm MacGregor - 4,913
Michael Lockey - 2,805
Larry Lee - 1,836
Zoltan Fekete - 1,327

Don River
Roger Hollander (incumbent) - 10,868
Paul Raina - 9,220

East Toronto
Paul Christie (incumbent) - acclaimed

Davenport
Dennis Fotinos - 7,452
Anne Ladouceur - 3,695
Peter Zahakos - 3,532
Dale Ritch - 1,697

Midtown
Ila Bossons (incumbent) - 14,776
Victor Knox - 6,996

North Toronto
Anne Johnston (incumbent) - 21,953
Paul Egli - 4,267

East York
Peter Oyler (incumbent) - 9,810
Steve Mastoras - 7,083
Mike Wyatt - 4,372

Lakeshore Queensway
Blake Kinahan (incumbent) -  9,055
Jeff Knoll - 6,624

Markland Centennial
Dick O'Brien (incumbent) - acclaimed

Kingsway Humber
Dennis Flynn (incumbent) - 13,097
Terry Howes - 5,825

Rexdale Thistletown
Lois Griffin (incumbent) - acclaimed

North York Humber
Mario Gentile (incumbent) - acclaimed

Black Creek
Maria Augimeri (incumbent) - 10,801
Frank Crudo - 3,298
Angela Natale

North York Spadina
Howard Moscoe (incumbent) - 11,129
Tibor Martinek - 2,589
Larry Wynne - 1,687

North York Centre South
Bev Salmon (incumbent) - acclaimed

North York Centre
Norman Gardner (incumbent) - 12,119
Jeffrey Smith - 3,028

Don Parkway
Marie Labette (incumbent) - 10,897
Louis Horvath - 3,544

Seneca Heights
Joan King (incumbent) - 11,624
Peter Lowry - 3,245

Scarborough Bluffs
Brian Ashton (incumbent) - 11,398
Frank Duckworth - 3,994

Scarborough Wexford
Maureen Prinsloo (incumbent) - 6,288
Hugh Canning - 4,820

Scarborough Centre
Brian Harrison (incumbent) - acclaimed

Scarborough Highland Creek
Ken Morrish (incumbent) - acclaimed

Scarborough Agincourt
Scott Cavalier (incumbent) - 7,171
Anne McBride - 4,236

Scarborough Malvern
Raymond Cho - 5,283
Bob Sanders (incumbent) - 3,977
Shan Rana - 1,321

York Eglinton
Mike Colle (incumbent) - 10,773
John Rocca - 2,223

York Humber
Alan Tonks (incumbent) - acclaimed

North York Humber Councillor Mario Gentile resigned on August 10, 1994 following a conviction for breach of trust. Paul Valenti was appointed to fill the vacancy on August 24.

Toronto

Mayor
In Toronto, the mayoral race was the first open contest in more than a decade as Mayor Art Eggleton decided not to run for re-election after 11 years. Jack Layton, a long-time city councillor and leader of the council's left wing contested the Mayor's position as the first-ever official candidate of the Metro New Democratic Party (NDP).

The centre-right was initially divided amongst three candidates, former city councillor June Rowlands who had most recently been chair of the police commission, then-city councillor Betty Disero and former alderman, provincial cabinet minister and Red Tory Susan Fish. Fearing that the 1991 election would be a repeat of 1978 where a split on the right allowed left-winger John Sewell to win, the business and development community worked behind the scenes to consolidate its support behind Rowlands. Lacking funds, Disero and Fish were forced to drop out before the close of nominations resulting in a two-way race between Rowlands and Layton with Rowlands proving victorious.  Fish's name remained on the ballot, as she withdrew after the deadline for nominations had passed.

Results taken from the Toronto Star newspaper, 14 November 1991, E8.  The final official results were not significantly different.

City council

As with Metro, city council was mostly stable with all incumbents who ran being reelected. The new council had six NDP affiliated members eight members on the right and two moderates who varied between the groups. New members included Kyle Rae, who won Layton's vacated downtown seat, and became the first ever openly gay man to serve on council.

 In Ward 1, incumbent Councillor William Boytchuk (who has served as councillor since 1969), had no problem keeping his seat, winning with a 13% margin over David Hutcheon. Hutcheon would later be elected to City Council in 1994 and serve as Budget Chief.

Councillor Korwin-Kuczynski, who has held the ward since 1982, defeated challenger Susan Shaw by nearly 20% in a head-to-head challenge.

Serving on Council since 1966, O'Donohue easily won re-election in his ward.

 Martin Silva has held the ward since winning for the first time in 1988, and won re-election over Nick Figliano and Ian Christie with almost half the vote.

 One term Councillor Liz Amer won re-election by a narrow margin over Benson Lau.
 

 Kyle Rae won the seat vacated by Jack Layton in his attempt to run for mayor, and became the first openly gay City Councillor in Toronto.

 Barbara Hall (who will later serve as mayor), soundly won her ward with 70% of the vote, in a one-on-one campaign against Edward Fortune.

 Future NDP MPP Peter Tabuns won his ward by a razor-thin margin. Tabuns defeated John Roy by just over 200 votes, the narrowest in the election campaign.

After the resignation of incumbent councillor Tom Clifford, the seat was won by Steve Ellis in a three-way race over the area's School Trustee Avril Usha Velupillai and Terry Brackett.

 Tom Jakobek, who has served as the councillor for the area since 1980, won re-election in an almost 3 to 1 margin over challenger Shelly Jean O'Neill.

 Incumbent Rob Maxwell won by a 700-vote margin over Walter Melnyk.

After dropping out in her run for mayor, Betty Disero ran for City Council, soundly defeating her challengers with 65% of the vote.

 John Adams won the ward of Yorkville. Ying Hope also attempted to make a political comeback, after serving as a Toronto alderman in the 1960s and 70s.

 Incumbent Howard Levine wins the upper-class ward with 43% of the vote, 11% over his next closest challenger John Gunning.

 The only ward where all candidates were female, incumbent Kay Gardner defeated her challenger Nnacy Griffin with 3 times the vote.

Michael Walker wins the ward with twice the number of votes as his next closest challenger.

East York
Dave Johnson was re-elected mayor by a wide margin. All the incumbents were re-elected. Ward 2 saw the closest race.

† - denotes incumbent status from previous council

Mayor
 †Dave Johnson 18,329
 Brenda Louella Kildey 3,977

Replacement mayor
On April 2, 1993, Johnson was elected to the provincial government in a by-election to replace Margery Ward who died in office. East York council decided to choose a new mayor amongst themselves rather than run a by-election that would have cost an estimated $500,000. Michael Prue won the contest after six rounds of balloting and he became the mayor for the rest of the term. Norm Crone was appointed to fill Prue's place on council.

Council
Two councillors were elected in each ward.

Ward 1
†Michael Prue 3,261
†Case Ootes 3,061
 John Couvell 1,347
 Michael Sokovnin 610

Ward 2
 †George Vasilopoulos 3,469
 David Anderson 3,269
 Paul Robinson 3,098

Ward 3
 Bob Dale 2,377
 John Papadakis 2,052
 John Antonopoulos 1,845
 Ed McConnell 1,357
 Jim Zotalis 487

Ward 4
 †Lorna Krawchuk 5,173
 †Jenner Jean-Marie 4,449
 Darrel Berry 3,050

Etobicoke

Mayor
 (incumbent)Bruce Sinclair 38,124 (55%)
 Norman Matusiak 31,327 (45%)

Matusiak, a lawyer and former deputy crown attorney with no previous political experience, did unexpectedly well Sinclair would go on to be defeated by Doug Holyday in the 1994 election.

Council
Ward 1
 (incumbent) Irene Jones 2,664 
 Peter Ramos 1,167
 Bon Gullins 1,037

Ward 2
 (incumbent) Alex Faulkner 2,878
Lynn Harrett 1,428
Peter Milczyn 1,142

Ward 3
 (incumbent) Ross Bissell 3,325
 Aileen Anderson 1,835
 Mark Palazzese 1,300
Ward 4
 (incumbent) Michael O'Rourke 5,669
 Stephen Boujikian 1,528
Ward 5
 (incumbent) Brian Flynn 2,563
 Anne Methot 1,747
 Susan Sotnick 1,524
 Ron Barr 877
 Abu Alam 137

Ward 6
 (incumbent) Doug Holyday (acclaimed)

Ward 7
 (incumbent) Gloria Luby 4,245
 John Woodroof 3,069

Ward 8
 (incumbent) Mary Huffman 4,718
 Raymond Morand 2,284
Ward 9 
 (incumbent) Alex Marchelli 3,187
 Peter Kell 1,791

Ward 10
 (incumbent) Brian Ineson 2,474
 David Robertson 2,229
 Frank Acri 935
 Brian Logie 151
Ward 11
(incumbent) Elizabeth Brown 1,333
Karen Herrell 1,079
Charlie Gordon 872
Darshan Singh 204
Ward 12
 (incumbent) John Hastings 2,351
Ron Strong 571
Anil Banerjee 436

North York
Mel Lastman was re-elected mayor of the North York for the seventh consecutive time which broke a record set 710 years ago in the 13th century. Only one incumbent councillor, Bob Bradley was defeated in Ward 13 by newcomer David Shiner. Two other newcomers joined him, John Filion and Maria Rizzo who replaced retiring councillors. All other councillors were re-elected.

Mayor
 (incumbent)Mel Lastman 91,449
 David K. Long 17,321

Council
Ward 1
 Mario Sergio 6,699
 Fred Craft 1,492

Ward 2
 Judy Sgro acclaimed

Ward 3
 Peter Li Preti 4,949
 Kathleen Walsh 1,174
 Lennox Farrell 1,072

Ward 4
 Frank Di Giorgio 5,150
 Marco DeVuono 1,484

Ward 5
 Mario Rizzo 5,908
 Linda Memmo 3,499
 Craig Deasley 832

Ward 6
 Milton Berger acclaimed

Ward 7
 Irving W. Chapley 4,867
 Shalom Schachter 2,649
 Michael Klein 518
 Sonnee Cohen 466 
 Jessie Silver 354 
 Mark Arshawsky 306 
 Lothar Hille 124

Ward 8
 Joanne Flint acclaimed

Ward 9
 Ron Summers 5,346 
 Freddy Trasmundi 3,341

Ward 10
 Don Yuill 3,770 
 Anne Lelovic 3,193 
 Tony West 683 
 Rod Gerrard 457

Ward 11
 John Filion 4,553 
 Mary Matrundola 2,680 
 Jack Arshawsky 289

Ward 12
 Barry Burton 4,212 
 Frank DiTomasso 2,418

Ward 13
 David Shiner 5,017 
 Bob Bradley 3,591

Ward 14
 Paul Sutherland 5,470 
 Gerry Scanlan 1,355

North York School Board
Ward 1 Emery
Sheila Lambrinos (NDP)
 
Ward 2 Amesbury Park/Black Creek
Bob Churchill

Ward 3 Jane/Finch
Stephnie Payne (NDP)

Ward 4 Lawrence Heights
Elsa Chandler

Ward 5 Downsview
Errol Young

Ward 6 Avenue Rd.

Results taken from the Toronto Star, 13 November 1991 (all polls reporting).  The final official results were not significantly different.

Ward 7 Wilson Heights
Mae Waese

Ward 8 Banbury-Windfields-St. Andrew's
Gerri Gershon

Ward 9 Senlac
Shelley Stillman

Ward 10 Don Mills-Flemingdon
Darlene Scott

Ward 11 Willowdale
Diane Meaghan

Ward 12 Victoria Village-Broadlands-Fenside
Kim Scott Liberal

Ward 13 Hillcrest
Dan Hicks

Ward 14 Oriole/Fairview/Pleasant View
David Caplan Liberal

Scarborough

Mayor
 (incumbent)Joyce Trimmer 67,458
 John O'Malley 11,728
 Max French 3,784
 Abel Van Wyk 2,758

City Councillors

Ward 1 
 Harvey Barron (acclaimed)

Ward 2
 (incumbent)Gerry Altobello 3,690
 Danny Lovatsis 1,734

Ward 3
 (incumbent) Mike Tzekas 2,357
 John Wardrope 2,192
 George Page 1,051
 Tom Furr 921
 Rocco Zambri 222

Ward 4
 (incumbent)Lorenzo Berardinetti 3,762
 Kurt Christensen 2,104
 Costas Manios 1,367
 Ruth A. Lunel 357

Ward 5 
 (incumbent)Marilyn Mushinski 2,783
 Paul Crawford 1,115
 George Walsh 1,040
 Steve Tonner 377

Ward 6
 (incumbent)Paul Mushinski 2,878
 Barry Christensen 1,603
 Tom Rowland 1,603
 Chris Kalpakis 512
 Chester Searles 426
 John Beatt 205
 Shawn Bredin 202

Ward 7
Fred Johnson (acclaimed)

Ward 8
(incumbent)Frank Faubert 3,952
David Soknacki 1,532
Steve Ryan 1,075
Michael Fiddes 119

Ward 9 
(incumbent)Ron Moeser 7,391
Joseph Pileggi 2,055

Ward 10 
(incumbent)Ron Watson 4,345
Herb Cotter 1,219

Ward 11
(incumbent)Sherene Shaw 3,552
Don Lombardi 1,457
Christopher Fermanis 1,230
Ayoub Ali 361

Ward 12
(incumbent)Doug Mahood 4,511
Bill Kan S. Choung 760
Norair Yeretsian 629
Norman Chan 303

Ward 13 
(incumbent)Bas Balkissoon 4,191
Herbert P. Valle 1,469

Ward 14 
Edith Montgomery acclaimed

York
The race for York council was the most volatile of all the Toronto votes. During the previous term, a development scandal occurred where at least two councillors were convicted of taking bribes from a developer to sell parkland for a condominium development. In all, six of eight incumbents were defeated. Only Fergy Brown as mayor and councillors Frances Nunziata and Bill Saundercook were re-elected. Nunziata was instrumental in exposing the scandal.

Mayor
 †Fergy Brown 18,702
 Phil White 12,776

Council
Ward 1
 Roz Mendelsohn 1,627
 †Ben Nobleman 1,254
 Marguerite Kaszecki-Pyron 938
 Kevin Fulbrook 429

Ward 2
 Joe Mihevc 929
 Branko Jovanovich 631
 Helen Poulopoulos 590
 †Tony Mandarano 571
 Joe Fazio 509
 Chaltanya Kalevar 497
 Claudio C. Lewis 54

Ward 3
 Rob Davis 859
 Angela Bianci 625
 Theo Evdoxiadis 475
 Mario Giansante 422
 Roland Saggiorato 402
 Gabriel Graziano 290
 Jose Perez 209
 Suzana Dozsa 178
 Leroy Crosse 152
 Tony Pizzolato 101

Ward 4
 Joan Roberts 1,149
 †Nicolo Fortunato 666
 Patrick Canavan 524
 Joe Piccininno 317

Ward 5
 Barry Rowland 941
 Lynda Palmer 917
 Mary Pedretti 710
 Enrico Iafolla 667
 †Jim Fera 466

Ward 6
 Michael McDonald 2,259
 †Bob McLean 1,417
 Bernard Thompson 1,375

Ward 7
 †Frances Nunziata 3,546
 Pat Rocca 834
 Harold Jinkinson 348

Ward 8
 †Bill Saundercook 2,506
 Ben Orszulak 1,227
 Fran Ferguson 593

† Incumbent

School Board
Ward 1
 Karen Hen

Ward 2
 Pete Karageorgos  (acclamation)

Ward 3
 John Mills

Ward 4
 Elizabeth Hill

Ward 5
 Joe Morriello

Ward 6 
 Bonnie Taylor

Ward 7
 Steven Mould

Ward 8 
 Madeline McDowell

References

1991
1991 Ontario municipal elections
1991 elections in Canada
1991 in Toronto